Liyannaj Kont Pwofitasyon, or LKP, is an umbrella group of approximately fifty trade unions and social movements in Guadeloupe. It spearheaded the general strike beginning in January 2009.

Name 
The name of the umbrella group comes from the local Antillean Creole language. The Liyannaj Kont Pwofitasyon (LKP) is translated to "Stand up against exploitation" in English or the "Collectif contre l'exploitation outrancière" in French.

Constituents of LKP

ADIM
AFOC
AGPIHM
AKIYO
AN BOUT AY
ANG
ANKA
ASSE
ANBT
Association Liberté Egalité Justice
CFTC
CGTG
CNL

Combat Ouvrier
Comité de l'Eau
Convention pour une Guadeloupe Nouvelle
COPAGUA
CSFG
CTU
Espérance Environnement
FAEN SNCL
Force Ouvrière
FSU
GIE SBT
KAMODJAKA

KAP GWADLOUP
Les Verts
MADICE
Mas Ka Klé
Mouvman NONM
PCG
SGEP/SNEC
SOS B/Terre ENVIRONNEMENT
SPEG
SUD PTT GWA
SUNICAG
SYMPA CFDT

Travayè é Péyizan
UDCLCV
UIR CFTDT
UNSA
UGTG
UPG
UPLG
UMPG
Voukoum
SNUIPP
ADEIC

References

Trade unions in Guadeloupe